Spraddle leg, also called splayed leg, is a condition in poultry in which the legs of newly born chicks are splayed laterally, meaning that they are unable to bear weight.

Causes
The cause has been attributed to a range of factors, although a slippery floor surface is most commonly implicated.

Treatment

Management focuses on the use of supports (or shackles) to bring the legs back towards the midline.

See also
 Chicken

References

Poultry diseases